Woodrow Earl Rich (March 9, 1916 – April 18, 1983) was a pitcher in Major League Baseball who played from 1939 through 1944 for the Boston Red Sox (1939–41) and Boston Braves (1944). He was born in Morganton, North Carolina.
   
In a four-season major league career, Rich posted a 6–4 record with a 5.06 ERA in 33 appearances, including 16 starts, five complete games, one save, 42 strikeouts, 50 walks, and 117 innings of work.  Rich also pitched 22 seasons in the minor leagues, winning 250 games and pitching over 3200 innings for 17 teams.

Rich served in the United States Marine Corps in 1945 during World War II.

Rich died in Morganton, North Carolina, at the age of 67.

References

External links

1916 births
1983 deaths
Boston Red Sox players
Boston Braves players
Major League Baseball pitchers
Baseball players from North Carolina
People from Morganton, North Carolina
Clarksdale Red Sox players
Little Rock Travelers players
Louisville Colonels (minor league) players
Scranton Red Sox players
San Diego Padres (minor league) players
Indianapolis Indians players
Anniston Rams players
Shreveport Sports players
Greensboro Patriots players
St. Petersburg Saints players
Memphis Chickasaws players
High Point-Thomasville Hi-Toms players
Savannah Redlegs players
Boise Braves players
Charlotte Hornets (baseball) players
United States Marine Corps personnel of World War II
Forest City Owls players
Rutherford County Owls players